Picture This is a 2008 romantic comedy film directed by Stephen Herek. Starring Ashley Tisdale and Kevin Pollak, the film was released on July 13, 2008, on television by ABC Family, branded as an ABC Family Original Movie, and on July 22, 2008, on DVD. The film is produced by Metro-Goldwyn-Mayer and drew 5.3 million viewers.

Plot
The unpopular Mandy Gilbert (Ashley Tisdale) lives with her strict father Tom (Kevin Pollak), and has only two friends, Alexa (Lauren Collins) and Cayenne (Shenae Grimes). She is bullied and mocked by the popular girls at her high school, particularly Lisa Cross (Cindy Busby). Lisa happens to be the girlfriend of Mandy's dreamboy love, swim team captain Drew Patterson (Robbie Amell). Mandy is about to turn 18 and wants her life to change.

Mandy decides to try out for the swim team, but loses her glasses at the pool and falls in the water unconscious. When she awakens, she finds out Drew gave her CPR and they talk to each other. Lisa thinks Mandy is a threat and tries to humiliate her by taking Drew to the pet shop where Mandy works. Instead, Drew does not care that Mandy works there and invites her to go out with him the next day.

Mandy turns 18 and her father surprises her by replacing her old glasses and phone with an expensive video phone and contact lenses. Her father reveals his intentions to join her when she moves to attend UCSB next year, but Mandy is too afraid to say anything about it. Later that day, Mandy flirts with Drew at the lake near school against her father's wishes. When Lisa finds out that Mandy is with Drew, she becomes outraged and uses Mandy's phone to film them. Lisa accidentally drops the phone to show Tom, who confronts Mandy. Before going home, Drew asks Mandy to his party on Saturday and Mandy happily accepts. At home, Tom is disappointed in Mandy's actions and bars her from going out or using electronics.

Mandy tells Alexa and Cayenne she wants to tell her father the truth about her whereabouts. When she does, Tom tells her he trusts her, and asks her if he has been a good dad. Mandy tells him he is a great dad, and decides not to tell she is actually at a party. Mandy attends the party with Drew. Since Alexa and Cayenne have told Mandy about the Patterson legend, she expects the worst. To her surprise, the "tower" actually turns out to be Drew's photography studio, which is filled with pictures of his family, friends, pets, and one of Mandy that he took at the lake. Seeing this, Mandy is relieved and realizes he just wants to spend time with her.

Drew goes to the bathroom to wash his hands, but does not tell Mandy what he is doing. Mandy thinks he is taking a shower and leaves after she becomes uncomfortable. Meanwhile, Lisa has been drinking all night and Alexa films her vomiting from under a glass table. The clip is shown playing on video screens as the girls exit the party.

Back at home, Tom shows Mandy an updated detachable version of the model home he built for them. However, Mandy sees this as a metaphor for their relationship, and explains that she does not want to feel detachable. Tom says that he trusts her and feels he should let her go.

Afterwards, Mandy and her friends attend their senior prom. Drew, the prom king, is about to crown Lisa as prom queen, but realizes that he truly loves Mandy. Drew brings Mandy up to the center stage and crowns her as the prom queen, as they share a passionate kiss.

Cast

Production 
The film was executive produced by Tisdale's company Blondie Girl Productions and directed by Stephen Herek. Tisdale said, "When I read the script for Picture This!, I just fell in love with the lead character Mandy, this goofy, unpopular, girl next door who knows what she wants, but isn't willing to sacrifice who she is to get it... Mandy's real and I think a lot of kids will relate to that. It reminds me a lot of when I was in high school."

The film was shot on location in Montreal, Quebec, during the summer months of 2007. Fender instruments, Juicy Couture, and Swiss Army all contributed props to the film. The freeway scene was actually shot in the borough of LaSalle. The mall scene was shot at Fairview Pointe-Claire. The school scenes were recorded at École secondaire du Chêne-Bleu in Pincourt.

Music and sound
The soundtrack of Picture This was never available to download in stores. It features Pat Benatar's 1980s single "Shadows of the Night", performed by Tisdale. The song "4ever" by The Veronicas could be heard on the promotional movies spots.

Soundtrack

DVD release
The film was released on DVD in the United States on July 22, 2008.

References

External links
 
 

2000s high school films
2008 romantic comedy films
2000s teen comedy films
2000s teen romance films
ABC Family original films
American high school films
American romantic comedy films
American teen comedy films
American teen romance films
American comedy television films
Films directed by Stephen Herek
Films shot in Montreal
Metro-Goldwyn-Mayer films
Romance television films
2008 films
Films about father–daughter relationships
American direct-to-video films
2008 direct-to-video films
Metro-Goldwyn-Mayer direct-to-video films
2000s English-language films
2000s American films